Trulock is a surname. Notable people with the surname include:

 , British railwayman who worked in Galicia
 William Trulock Beeks (1906–1988), United States federal judge
Camilo José María Manuel Juan Ramón Francisco Javier de Jerónimo Cela y Trulock, 1st Marquess of Iria Flavia (1916–2002), Spanish novelist, poet, story writer, and essayist